The following is a comprehensive list of awards and nominations received by British actress Claire Foy.

Foy first received recognition for her role in the period drama miniseries Little Dorrit (2008). She received similar praise for her portrayal of the ill-fated queen Anne Boleyn in the period drama miniseries Wolf Hall (2015), for which she garnered a nomination for the BAFTA TV Award for Best Actress.

Foy gained worldwide recognition and universal acclaim for her portrayal of Queen Elizabeth II on the Netflix original drama series The Crown (2016–17), winning several popular industry awards: including a Golden Globe Award for Best Actress – Television Series Drama, two Screen Actors Guild Awards for Outstanding Performance by a Female Actor in a Drama Series, a Primetime Emmy Award for Outstanding Lead Actress in a Drama Series and a Primetime Emmy Award for Outstanding Guest Actress in a Drama Series

For her performance in Damien Chazelle's biographical drama film First Man (2018), Foy was nominated for the Golden Globe Award for Best Supporting Actress – Motion Picture, the Critics' Choice Movie Award for Best Supporting Actress, and the BAFTA Award for Best Actress in a Supporting Role. She also received a Critics' Choice Movie Award as a role model for the "#SeeHer movement", a professional media movement sponsored by media companies for the furthering of women onscreen.

Major associations

BAFTA Awards

Emmy Awards

Golden Globe Awards

Independent Spirit Awards

Screen Actors Guild Awards

Miscellaneous awards

Broadcasting Press Guild Awards

Gold Derby Awards

Monte-Carlo Television Festival Awards

National Board of Review Award

Royal Television Society

Satellite Awards

Critic awards

Major Critics Associations

Critics' Choice Movie Awards

Critics' Choice Television Awards

Television Critics Association Awards

Miscellaneous Critics Associations

References

External links
 

Foy, Claire